David Affengruber (born 4 March 1992) is an Austrian professional footballer who plays as a goalkeeper for 1. Niederösterreichische Landesliga club SC Zwettl.

References

External links 

1992 births 
Living people
Austrian footballers
Association football goalkeepers
SKU Amstetten players
2. Liga (Austria) players
Austrian Regionalliga players
Austrian Landesliga players